is a Japanese born, Australian tennis player.

Early life
Santillan was born in Tokyo to a Japanese mother and a South African father of Spanish descent. He lived the first 8 years of his life in Japan before his family relocated to the Gold Coast, Australia and became citizens. He played much of his junior tennis at the Gold Coast before moving to Brisbane to join the national academy program at the Queensland Tennis Centre.

Junior career
On the junior tour, Santillan has a career high ITF junior ranking of 7 achieved in September 2015. Santillan's major highlights on the junior tour included a semi-final at the 2015 Australian Open and doubles finals at the 2014 French Open and the 2015 Wimbledon Championships.

In March 2015, Santillan opted to play under the Japanese flag instead due to a fractious relationship with Tennis Australia. He returned to playing under the Australian flag in 2017.

Junior Grand Slam finals

Doubles

Professional career
Santillan has a career high ATP singles ranking of 160 achieved on 24 July 2017. He also has a career high ATP doubles ranking of 265 achieved also on 17 July 2017. Santillan has won 6 ITF Futures singles titles and 1 ITF Futures doubles title.

Santillan made his ATP main draw debut at the 2016 Generali Open Kitzbühel, receiving singles and doubles main draw wildcards.

Santillan lost in the first round of the 2022 Australian Open – Men's singles qualifying.

Challenger and Futures/World Tennis Tour finals

Singles: 13 (8-5)

Doubles: 17 (9–8)

References

External links
 
 
 

1997 births
Living people
Australian male tennis players
Japanese male tennis players
Sportspeople from Tokyo
Tennis players from Brisbane
Tennis people from the Gold Coast
Japanese emigrants to Australia
Australian people of South African descent
Australian people of Spanish descent
Japanese people of South African descent
Japanese people of Spanish descent